Beldandi is a rural municipality in Kanchanpur District in Sudurpashchim Province of southwestern Nepal named after the former Village Development Committee. At the time of the 1991 Nepal census the VDC had a population of 9301 people living in 1483 individual households. According to the Nepal census 2011 the municipality had 3022 individual households and a population of 21,959. In the north and west, Beldandi is surrounded by Suklaphatha national park. To the east lies Belauri Municipality. On the south, it borders India.

The main attractions in Beldandi are the local Tharu dance Gaura Festival and some night parties. In the education, there is a college named Rauleshwar Adarsh Janata Multiple Campus and Rauleshwar Higher Secondary School. The main shopping places are Chawanni Bazaar and Beldandi bazaar, small towns that supply daily goods and services.

Educational institutions
Educational institutes in the local area include:

Government schools
 Rauleshwar Janata Adarsh Multiple Campus
 Ganesh Secondary School
 Rauleshwar Secondary School
 Shree Siddhanath Secondary School
 Shree Saraswati Janata Secondary School
 Shree Baijanath Secondary School
 Shree Tribhuwan Secondary School
 Shree Kalika Primary School
 Shree Singhapal Primary School

Private schools
 Shree Model Child Care Boarding School
 Shree Navajyoti Public School
 Shree Kanchan Galaxy Public School
 Shree Westpoint Public School
 Shree Little Star Boarding School
 Shree Long Vision Public School
 Shree Jivan Rekha Public School
 Gurukul Academy, Beldnadi Bazar 
 Shree Sagarmatha Public School
 Shree Oxford Public School
 Shree Global School

Economy

The local economy mainly based on agriculture and few with business and service. Rice, wheat, corn and other crops are grown in there. Local farmers lack the modern knowledge of farming so they can not get good harvests.

Business Areas:
 Chawanni Bazaar
 Beldandi Bazaar

Health centers
Beldandi primary health care centers

Ward clinics are available in each wards 

Various private clinics in Beldandi bazaar and Chawanni

Local culture and religion

Most of the local people believe in Hinduism so their customs mainly influenced by the Hindu rituals. The local culture mainly depends upon the ethnic groups living in the place. In spite of residence of different ethnic group this area has quite mixed cultures and traditions. The local Tharu people usually have their own traditions while others are migrated from the hilly region of the country.

Transportation

The transportation in Beldandi is mainly bus service that runs daily from Mahendranagar to Sreepur. The local transportation is two-wheelers. Auto-rickshaws that run from Daijee to Kalikich (Camp) are quite common.

References

Populated places in Kanchanpur District
Nepal municipalities established in 2015
Rural municipalities in Kanchanpur District

ne:बेलडाँडी नगरपालिका